Supplanaxis leyteensis is a species of sea snail, a marine gastropod mollusk in the family Planaxidae.

Description
The length of the shell attains 19 mm.

Distribution
This marine species occurs off the Philippines.

References

 Poppe G.T., Tagaro S.P. & Stahlschmidt P. (2015). New shelled molluscan species from the central Philippines I. Visaya. 4(3): 15-59. page(s): 22, pl. 6 figs 1-3.

External links
 Worms Link

Planaxidae